So Fresh: The #1 Hits is a compilation of songs which have peaked at #1 on the Australian ARIA Singles Chart in various years, released on 17 May 2008.

Track listing

Disc 1 
Avril Lavigne – "Girlfriend" (3:36)
Gwen Stefani – "What You Waiting For?" (3:43)
Alien Ant Farm – "Smooth Criminal" (3:27)
Akon – "Lonely" (3:34)
Fergie – "Big Girls Don't Cry" (4:32)
Justin Timberlake – "Rock Your Body" (4:27)
Pink – "Most Girls" (5:00)
Chris Brown – "Run It!" (3:15)
Britney Spears – "Toxic" (3:20)
The Pussycat Dolls – "Don't Cha" (4:03)
Usher – "Burn" (4:17)
Christina Aguilera – "Beautiful" (4:00)
TV Rock featuring Seany B – "Flaunt It" (3:30)
NSYNC – "Bye Bye Bye" (3:21)
Backstreet Boys – "Incomplete" (3:59)
The Black Eyed Peas – "Shut Up" (5:10)
Mýa – "Case of the Ex" (3:53)
Outkast – "Roses" (4:15)
2Pac featuring Elton John – "Ghetto Gospel" (3:59)

Disc 2
Wheatus – "Teenage Dirtbag" (4:05)
Anastacia – "Left Outside Alone" (4:16)
Hinder – "Lips of an Angel" (4:22)
Lifehouse – "Hanging by a Moment" (3:36)
Lighthouse Family – "High" (4:36)
Guy Sebastian – "Angels Brought Me Here" (3:58)
Delta Goodrem and Brian McFadden – "Almost Here" (3:47)
Vanessa Carlton – "A Thousand Miles" (3:58)
Nelly featuring Kelly Rowland – "Dilemma" (4:49)
Nitty – "Nasty Girl" (4:08)
t.A.T.u. – "All the Things She Said" (3:34)
Will Smith – "Switch" (3:18)
Shannon Noll – "Learn to Fly" (4:13)
Paulini – "Angel Eyes" (4:04)
Sandi Thom – "I Wish I Was a Punk Rocker (With Flowers in My Hair)" (2:34)
Anthony Callea – "Rain" (3:48)
Aqua – "Doctor Jones" (3:23)
50 Cent – "In da Club" (3:12)
Afroman – "Because I Got High" (3:20)

Charts

Certifications

References 

So Fresh albums
2008 compilation albums
2008 in Australian music